Section 81 of the Constitution of Australia creates a "consolidated revenue fund", money collected by the Commonwealth through taxation and other levies.  The way this money may be collected is regulated by Section 51 of the Constitution. Notable legal decisions decided by the High Court of Australia about section 81 include "the Pharmaceutical Benefits case"

Text

References

External links 
 Commonwealth of Australia Constitution Act - Sect 81 from AustLII

Australian constitutional law